The Eastman School of Music Student Living Center is a residential building that is part of the Eastman School of Music in Rochester, New York.

References

Residential buildings completed in 1990
Eastman School of Music
University and college dormitories in the United States
Residential skyscrapers in Rochester, New York
1990 establishments in New York (state)